Smell rights are claims of ownership to particular smells. These rights can include copyright or non-conventional trademark.

In France, the scent of a perfume is not eligible for copyright.

In 2006, a Dutch court ruled that a perfume could have a copyright.

Legal commentators have described possible systems for trademarking scents.

In the United States, Hasbro has a trademark for the smell of Play-Doh.

References

Trademark law
Odor
Copyright law